Barbara Cooper may refer to:
Barbara Cooper (politician) (1929–2022), American politician
Barbara Cooper (RAF officer) (born 1959), British Royal Air Force officer
Barbara Cooper (artist) (born 1949), American artist
 Barbara Cooper (physicist) (1953–1999), American physicist
Barbara Cooper (water skier), World Champion water skier